Čačinci is a village and a municipality in Croatia in Virovitica-Podravina County. It has a population of 2,802 (2011 census), 91% of which are Croats. 
It is known for being very hot in the summer and very cold in the winter.

References

Municipalities of Croatia
Populated places in Virovitica-Podravina County